Richard Theodore Titlebaum (January 26, 1939 in Boston – 2006) was a writer, artist, antiquarian book collector and literature professor.

Biography
Richard Theodore Titlebaum attended Boston Latin School, and received a B.A.(1960) and M.A. from Harvard. In 1969, he received a doctorate in English literature from Harvard University.

Titlebaum died October 9, 2006, in Ann Arbor, Michigan.

Literary and art career
He taught literature at Harvard, the University of California, Berkeley, the University of Haifa and the University of the Witwatersrand.

In 1976, he decided to devote himself full-time to painting. He participated in over 300 art events in 27 states and won 48 awards. Some of Titlebaum's works were done in Surrealistic styles, often with Old Testament religious motifs. He was especially interested in Middle Eastern history and the Jewish Revolts. Many of his large paintings were donated to the Leslie Lohman Gay Art Foundation on his death and may be viewed on their website. At the end of his life, most of his work was religious in subject matter. His paintings are in the Fogg Art Museum, the Permanent Collection of the Leslie-Lohman Gay Art Foundation in New York City, Liberty University, and the Miami City Hall.

Published works
His Harvard thesis, completed in 1969 but published only in 1987, is entitled: Three Victorian Views of the Italian Renaissance: John Ruskin, Walter Pater and John Addington Symonds.

References

External links
 Titlebaum Art Gallery *Leslie Lohman Gay Art Foundation

1939 births
2006 deaths
20th-century American painters
21st-century American painters
American male painters
Harvard University alumni
Harvard University faculty
University of California, Berkeley faculty
Academic staff of the University of Haifa
Academic staff of the University of the Witwatersrand
20th-century American male artists